Marina Nikolaevna Stets (born 21 February 1973) is a retired Belarusian tennis player.

Stets won one singles and ten doubles titles on the ITF tour in her career. On 19 June 1995, she reached her best singles ranking of world number 403. On 18 September 1995, she peaked at world number 220 in the doubles rankings.

Stets appeared four times for the Belarus Fed Cup team, losing each match.

ITF finals (11–8)

Singles (1–2)

Doubles (10–6)

Fed Cup participation

Doubles

References

External links 
 
 
 

1973 births
Living people
Tennis players from Minsk
Belarusian female tennis players